Krzysztof Kaczmarek (born October 28, 1988, in Wrocław) is a former Polish footballer.

Career

Club
In January 2011, he moved to MKS Kluczbork.

References

External links
 
 

1988 births
Polish footballers
Czarni Żagań players
Śląsk Wrocław players
Stilon Gorzów Wielkopolski players
MKS Kluczbork players
Living people
Sportspeople from Wrocław
Association football midfielders